Maryland Public Secondary Schools Athletic Association (MPSSAA),  is the association that oversees public high school sporting contests in the state of Maryland. Organized after World War II in 1946, the MPSSAA is made up of public high schools from each of Maryland's 23 counties and independent city of Baltimore City, which joined the association in 1993 when its public high schools withdrew at the orders of a new Superintendent of Public Instruction  (schools) in the Baltimore City Public Schools from the earlier longtime  athletic league, the Maryland Scholastic Association (M.S.A.) which was founded in 1919. The MSA had been composed of public high schools in the City of Baltimore and private / religious / independent schools on the secondary level in the City of Baltimore and its metropolitan area and the surrounding central Maryland region. It was one of the few state-level interscholastic  athletic leagues in the nation composed of both public and private/religious/independent secondary schools. After the Baltimore City public high schools withdrew from the MSA, the remaining private/religious/independent schools conferred and organized two parallel regional/state-wide athletic leagues with sports competition and exercise activities with one for young men and the other for young women. These were the  Maryland Interscholastic Athletic Association (M.I.S.A.A. - for boys) and the Interscholastic Athletic Association of Maryland]] (I.S.A.A.M. - for girls) which endured today. All three  state-wide athletic leagues, two for private/religious/independent secondary schools and one for co-ed public high schools exist today marrying on the proud traditions, memories and championships  of the old Maryland Scholastic Association  (MSA) - one of the oldest state athletic leagues for secondary schools in the country.

The current MPSSAA includes nearly 200 public high schools, with more than 110,000 student-athletes participating in 24 sports. The Maryland State Board of Education establishes the rules and regulations governing the Maryland Public Secondary Schools Athletic Association athletic programs and functions under the Division of Instruction of the Maryland State Department of Education. All qualified public high schools in Maryland in the 23 counties who qualify under rules and regulations  may become members of the Maryland Public Secondary Schools Athletic Association. This includes the team who qualifies to play Quince Orchard in the football 4A state championship.

The purpose of the Association is to promote, direct, and control all interscholastic activities of high school students; to establish, maintain, and enforce regulations to assure that all such activities are part of and contribute toward the comprehensive educational program of the state of Maryland; to work with the state department of education in the development of the program to safeguard the physical, mental, and moral welfare of high school students and protect them from exploitation.

Sponsored Sports

Team Sports

Fall
Field Hockey
Football
Soccer – Girls and Boys
Volleyball

Winter
Basketball – Girls and Boys

Spring
Baseball
Lacrosse – Girls and Boys
Softball

Individual sports

Fall
Cross-Country – Girls and Boys
Golf

Winter
Indoor Track – Girls and Boys
Swimming & Diving – Girls and Boys
Wrestling

Spring
Track & Field – Girls and Boys
Tennis – Girls and Boys

Administration

2013-2014 MPSSAA Officers

Past Presidents

1947-48....................William Brish

1949-50....................William Brish

1950-51............George Carrington

1951-52............George Carrington

1952-53 ..................Arthur Ramey

1953-54 ......................Ellery Ward

1954-55..............Crescent J. Bride

1955-56 ............Stephan A. Lerda

1956-57................Edward Semler

1957-58 ..............Charles Hudson

1958-59..............Warren R. Evans

1959-60 ..............Robert E. Pence

1960-61 ..............Charles R. Berry

1961-62....Vincent C. Holochwost

1962-63........William J. Callaghan

1963-64..G. Wayne Burgemeister

1964-65..........William E. Dykes Jr.

1965-66......................Jack Willard

1966-67..................Edward Finzel

1967-68..............Harold S. Martin

1968-69..............Crescent J. Bride

1969-70................Warren Squires

1970-71....................Marvin C. Joy

1971-72..........John E. Molesworth

1972-73 ................Robert Melville

1973-74......................Albert Cesky

1974-76 ........................Earl Hersh

1976-78..............Robert M. Foster

1978-80............Mildred H. Murray

1980-82 ..............Robert E. Pence

1982-84..........................Jim Heins

1984-86........................Roy Comer

1986-88............Clarence Johnson

1988-90..................W. Cecil Short

1990-92....................Chuck Brown

1992-94 ..................Patricia Barry

1994-96 ............Ronald J. Belinko

1996-98..............Donald E. Cooke

1998-00..............Mary Etta Reedy

2000-02 ..................Marlene Kelly

2002-04................Robert P. Wade

2004-06..........................Jay Berno

2006-08........................David Byrd

2008-10..................Andrew Roper

2010-12................William Beattie

Member High Schools
Due to the state's unique geography, Maryland high school athletics is divided into nine districts by the MPSSAA for purposes of organizing athletic activities and postseason tournaments. MPSSAA member schools compete within geographic regions (jurisdictions) and are divided into leagues across the state. In total, there are five conferences and six counties competing together to form a league, but remaining independent.

Classifications

The MPSSAA's 197 member schools are arranged by classification to ensure that schools compete on a regular basis with other schools in the geographic area of a similar size. The classifications are 1A (the smallest), 2A, 3A, and 4A (the largest).

 1A = Lowest 25 percent based on enrollment
 2A = Next 25 percent based on enrollment
 3A = Next 25 percent based on enrollment
 4A = Top 25 percent based on enrollment

District Alignment

District 1 – Allegany, Carroll, Frederick, Garrett, and Washington counties
District 2 – Montgomery County
District 3 – Prince George's County
District 4 – Charles, Calvert, and St. Mary's counties
District 5 – Anne Arundel and Howard counties
District 6 – Baltimore County
District 7 – Cecil and Harford counties
District 8 – Caroline, Dorchester, Kent, Queen Anne's, Somerset, Talbot, Wicomico, and Worcester counties
District 9 – Baltimore City

Conferences

Appalachian Mountain Athletic Conference

Bayside Conference

Monocacy Valley Athletic League

Southern Maryland Athletic Conference

Upper Chesapeake Bay Athletic Conference

Independents

Anne Arundel County League
Annapolis High School
Arundel High School
Broadneck High School
Chesapeake High School, Pasadena
Crofton High School
Glen Burnie High School
Meade Senior High School
North County High School
Northeast Senior High School
Old Mill High School
Severna Park High School
South River High School
Southern High School

Baltimore City League

The Baltimore City College ("City")
The Baltimore Polytechnic Institute ("Poly")
Carver Vocational Technical High School
Digital Harbor High School (formerly Southern High School (Baltimore)
Paul Laurence Dunbar Community High School
Edmondson-Westside High School
Frederick Douglass High School
Forest Park High School
Lake Clifton/Eastern High School
Mergenthaler Vocational - Technical High School ("Mervo")
Northwestern High School
Patterson High School
Reginald F. Lewis High School
Southwestern High School
Western High School

Baltimore County League
Catonsville High School
Chesapeake High School
Dulaney High School
Dundalk High School
Eastern Technical High School
Franklin High School
George Washington Carver Center for Arts and Technology
Hereford High School
Kenwood High School
Lansdowne High School
Loch Raven High School
Milford Mill Academy
New Town High School
Overlea High School
Owings Mills High School
Parkville High School
Patapsco High School
Perry Hall High School
Pikesville High School
Randallstown High School
Sparrows Point High School
Towson High School
Western School of Technology and Environmental Science
Woodlawn High School

Howard County League

Atholton High School
Centennial High School
Glenelg High School
Hammond High School
Howard High School
Long Reach High School
Marriotts Ridge High School
Mount Hebron High School
Oakland Mills High School
Reservoir High School
River Hill High School
Wilde Lake High School

Montgomery County League
Bethesda-Chevy Chase High School
Montgomery Blair High School
James Hubert Blake High School
Winston Churchill High School
Clarksburg High School
Damascus High School
Albert Einstein High School
Gaithersburg High School
Walter Johnson High School
John F. Kennedy High School
Colonel Zadok A. Magruder High School
Richard Montgomery High School
Northwest High School
Northwood High School
Paint Branch High School
Poolesville High School
Quince Orchard High School
Rockville High School
Seneca Valley High School
Sherwood High School
Springbrook High School
Watkins Mill High School
Wheaton High School
Walt Whitman High School
Thomas Sprigg Wootton High School

Prince George's (PG) County League
Bladensburg High School
Bowie High School
Central High School
Crossland High School
Frederick Douglass High School
DuVal High School
Fairmont Heights High School
Charles Herbert Flowers High School
Friendly High School
Gwynn Park High School
Henry Alexander Wise Jr., High School
High Point High School
Largo High School
Laurel High School
Northwestern High School
Oxon Hill High School
Parkdale High School
Potomac High School
Eleanor Roosevelt High School
Suitland High School
Surrattsville High School

Out-of-state teams
Musselman High School's Applemen, in Inwood, West Virginia, regularly plays teams in Washington County, even though Musselman is in Berkeley County.

Recent Champions (since 1993)
The following member schools have won state championships since the MPSSAA expanded in 1993:

Boys Basketball Champions

Since 1993, Baltimore City League members have won a combined 35 MPSSAA state boys basketball titles. During that time, Prince George's County ranks second among all MPSSAA leagues with 17 state championships. Baltimore County teams have won 10 titles, while Montgomery County League teams have won nine. Teams from the Eastern Shore have won eight state titles over the last 22 seasons, most in the 1A classification. MVAC members have earned three state title wins. Howard County and UCBAC teams boast two state championships each since 1993. The SMAC and Western Maryland-based Allegany have won the final two of the 88 state titles earners in the four classifications over the last 22 seasons. The Anne Arundel County League hasn't won a boys basketball state title since 1990 until 2015 when Meade High School defeated Bethesda-Chevy Chase High School in the 4A State title game on March 14, 2015.

See also
 Maryland Interscholastic Athletic Association — a boys' sports conference for private high schools generally located in the Baltimore metropolitan area
 Interscholastic Athletic Association of Maryland — an association of schools that organizes the female athletic programs in the Baltimore metropolitan area
 Washington Catholic Athletic Conference - an association of Catholic Schools in the Washington, DC metropolitan area, which also includes schools in Maryland and Virginia

References

External links
Official site

High school sports associations in the United States
Maryland high school sports conferences
Sports organizations established in 1946